The Cable Liner is a range of automated people mover products designed by Doppelmayr Cable Car for use at airports, in city centers, intermodal passenger transport connections, park and ride facilities, campuses, resorts and amusement parks.

The design superseded the maglev transport system at Birmingham Airport which was, at the time, the world’s only commercial maglev system. The technology was used for the new AirRail Link on the existing maglev guideway to replace the previous system and temporary bus-service shuttle that had been operating in the meantime.

System features 

The automated people mover systems are based on cable-propelled technology.

In a cable-propelled automated people mover system, a central station powers the system, and therefore the train has no on-board drive engines, gearboxes or brakes. A fixed grip assembly connects the train to the cable. The cable propels, accelerates, and decelerates the train.

The system operation is monitored from a central control room; there are no drivers, conductors or operators on-board.

The evacuation system is based on an independent stationary diesel emergency drive that would pull a stranded train back to the station, eliminating the need for an emergency walkway. Trains like these can be also used for different purposes, such as moving trailers and barge loaders.

Guideway 

The automated people mover uses a self-supporting steel guideway. It is a light steel guideway, which is possible because of the use of lighter trains. The track consists of an I-beam which forms the running and guiding surface. The guideway superstructure is a steel framework construction. The guideway does not require heating in harsh winter conditions. Steel adapters between the steel truss guideway and the concrete columns allow height adjustments to compensate for ground settlements. The track can span more than 67 m (220 ft).

Because the guideway superstructure is a steel framework construction and do not have a solid track base, platform screen doors are used at stations on the system.

Vehicles 

The trains are bidirectional. The car is a self-supporting lightweight design with extruded aluminium box-type profile sections. The integral monocoque structure is bolted and riveted and joint connections are aluminium castings. The aluminium sections are made of high-grade, corrosion-resistant alloy. The undercarriage supports are integrated into the car body and take the form of cavity-sealed tubular steel frames. The design is torsion-free. The vehicle interior is predominantly aluminium, with no heat release.

The vehicles are usually manufactured by Swiss cabin manufacturer, CWA Constructions, itself a subsidiary of Doppelmayr Garaventa Group; or Austrian cabin manufacturer, Carvatech.

Configurations 
There are three main system configurations in use.

Shuttle 
The "Single Shuttle" system is the simplest configuration, with one train operating in both directions on one guideway track.

The "Double Shuttle" configuration features two independent shuttle systems operating side by side on a double guideway track, each with its own haul rope and drive machinery. If one shuttle system fails or is closed for maintenance, the other system may continue to operate. This configuration is designed for system lengths up to 3 km (1.8 mi) and may have several intermediate stations.

The frequency and passenger capacity of both shuttle systems depends largely on the length of the system, and the number of intermediate stations. The passenger capacity additionally depends on the capacity of the train.

Bypass 
In this system, only one guideway enters each end station, but movable switches direct trains onto dual tracks between stations so they can pass one another en route. The bypass must be located approximately in the middle of two terminal end stations, and can form part of an intermediate station. This configuration is comparable to the Double Shuttle system in terms of capacity and frequency (headway). Either each train has its own haul rope or both trains are attached to the same haul rope depending on the application requirements (station configuration, system length, etc.).

Pinched Loop 
This system creates a circular train flow  where more than one train moves in the same direction. The principle of this system is based on several rope loops which adjoin and overlap each other in the stations. Every haul rope loop is supplied with its own drive and return machinery. In every station each vehicle of the train has to be disconnected from the current haul rope to the next haul rope in order to continue the circular and synchronized train flow. The haul rope loop change may occur only when all the trains are positioned at the standard stop position in the stations and are standstill and will be carried out during boarding/alighting of the passengers. Switches installed at the end stations will guide the train from one lane of the double lane track over to a single guideway in the end stations. During the station stop the switch will be repositioned that the train can leave the station at the other lane of the double lane track. For the functionality of the Pinched Loop concept the stations spans have to be approximately equidistant from each other.

Installations 

 
 Mandalay Bay Tram system installed in Las Vegas
 Aria Express installed in Las Vegas
 LINK Train system installed in Toronto Pearson International Airport
 AirRail Link system at Birmingham International Airport
 Aerotren system at Mexico International Airport
 People Mover in Venice
 Cabletren Bolivariano system installed in Caracas
 BART to OAK Airport, connecting the BART system to Oakland International Airport
 Automated Passenger Transportation System (APTS) at Sheremetyevo International Airport
 Hamad International Airport Shuttle installed in Doha
 Luton DART at Luton Airport near London, UK

See also 
Cable car (railway)
Funicular
MiniMetro

Notes

References

External links 
 DCC Doppelmayr Cable Car

 Cable Liner
Doppelmayr/Garaventa Group